Alfred Blaschko (4 March 1858 – 26 March 1922) was a German dermatologist who was a native of Freienwalde an der Oder. 

In 1881 he earned his medical doctorate at Berlin, and afterwards worked with Georg Wegner (1843–1917) in Stettin. Later he opened a private dermatological practice in Berlin. 

Blaschko specialized in the study of occupational dermatoses and prophylaxis of venereal disease. He performed studies of prostitution and examined the sanitary conditions in this profession.
In 1902 with Albert Neisser he co-founded the Liga zur Bekämpfung der Geschlechtskrankheiten (German Society for the Fight against Venereal Diseases) in Berlin.

In 1901 at the Seventh Congress of the German Dermatological Society held in Breslau, Blaschko presented his observations of a rare dermatological condition. It involved patterned skin lesions that were S-shaped on the abdomen, V-shaped over the upper spinal region with an inverted U-shape from the breast onto the upper arm. Blaschko had based his findings on examinations of over 140 patients with nevoid and acquired linear skin diseases. This unusual patterned condition was later referred to as "lines of Blaschko". Although he proposed an embryonic origin for this phenomenon, he did not provide further detail in this regard.

Selected writings 
 Syphilis und Prostitution vom Standpunkt der öffentlichen Gesundheitspflege. Berlin, 1893. (Syphilis and prostitution from the standpoint of public health care).
 Hygiene der Prostitution und venerischen Krankheiten. Jena, 1900. (Hygiene of prostitution and venereal diseases).
 Die Neven-verteilung in der Haut in ihrer Beziehung zu den Erkrankungen der Haut. Beilage zu den Verhandlungen der Deutschen Dermatologischen Gesellschaft VII Congress, Breslau, 1901.

References 
 Indian Journal of Dermatology Lines of Blaschko
 Alfred Blaschko @ Who Named It

1858 births
1922 deaths
People from Bad Freienwalde
German dermatologists
People from the Province of Brandenburg